The 1967 Campeonato Argentino de Rugby   was won by selection of Buenos Aires beating in the final the selection of  Rosario

That year in Argentina rugby union 
 The Buenos Aires Champsionship was won by Belgrano AC and Club Atlético San Isidro
 The Cordoba Province Championship was won by Córdoba Athletic
 The North-East Championship was won by Los Tarcos and Universitario Tucuman
The Club Atlético del Rosario celebrated their first 100 years of life and host the "final four" of the championship. For the first time a "Third Place final" was played
Argentina won, as usual 1967 South American Rugby Championship
The Union of Jujuy become independent form Tucumàn ones.

Knock out stages

Semifinals 

  Rosario: G. Seaton, E. España, J. Benzi, G. Escobar, A. Quetglas, J. Scilabra, C. Cristi, J. Imhoff, M. Chesta, J. Costante, J. Sylvester, F. Tricerri, R. Seaton, M. Bouza, F. Lando.
Cordoba: L. Capell, E. meta, H. Espinoza, J. Astrada, J. Seeber, O. Samuele, J. Rubio, G. Ribeca, H. Ferreyra, A. Giavedoni, R. Campra, M. Enríquez, P. Demo, J. C. Taleb, R. Loyola.

 Santa Fè: J. Vera, O. Ferrero, H. Lauría, E. Bezombe, P. Bolcato, J. González, G. Ibáquez, D. Motta, R. Rapela, M. Celentano, G. Rapela, P. Dekleva, G. Rapela, J. Aguilera, J. Barbagelata.
Buones Aires: D. Morgan, M. Walther, A. Travaglini, A. Rodríguez Jurado, M. Pascual, H. Méndeez, A. Echegaray, E. Scharenberg, A. Otaño, J. O'Reilly, A. Anthony, E. Verardo, R. Foster, R. Handley, L. García Yáñez.

Third place final

 Cordoba J. Vera, O. Ferrero, P. Bolcatto, H. Lauría, e. Bezombe, R. Lozano, J. González, H. Maletti, M. Celentano, R. Rapela, D. Mota, P. Dekleva, G. Rapela, G. Rodríguez, R. Morla. 
Santa Fè';  L. Capell, H. Espinosa, O. Samuele, J. Seeber, E. Meta, J. Rubio, M. Xavier, G. Ribeca, H. Ferreyra, A. Giavedoni, R. Campra, E. Manuel, C. Abud, J. C. Taleb, P. Demo.

Final 

 Rosario :J. Seaton, E. España, R. Villavicencio, J. Benzi, A. Quetglas, J. Scilabra, C. Christi, J. L. Imhoff, M. Chesta, J. Constante, M. Bouza, A. Colla, J. Sylvester, R. Seaton, F. Tricerri. 
Buenos Aires D. Morgan, M. Walther, A. Travaglini, A. Rodríguez Jurado, M. Pascual, H. Méndez, A. Etchegaray, J. O'Reilly, H. Silva, E. Sharenberg, B. Otaño, A. Anthony, L. García Yáñez, R. Handley, R. Foster.

External links 
Memorias de la UAR 1967
Rugby Archive

Campeonato Argentino de Rugby
Argentina
Campeonato